Mislav "Mimi" Saric (born 3 September 1983 in Požega) is an Australian footballer who plays for South Australian Super League team Adelaide Raiders. His previous clubs include Porin Palloilijat, Perth Glory, HNK Cibalia, Adelaide United, Adelaide City, Adelaide Raiders, Campbelltown City and the Australian Institute of Sport.

External links
 
 Oz Football profile

1983 births
Living people
People from Požega, Croatia
Australian people of Croatian descent
Association football forwards
Croatian footballers
Australian soccer players
Australia youth international soccer players
Adelaide City FC players
Adelaide United FC players
Perth Glory FC players
Campbelltown City SC players
Porin Palloilijat players
HNK Cibalia players
A-League Men players
FFSA Super League players
National Premier Leagues players
Croatian expatriate footballers
Australian expatriate soccer players
Expatriate footballers in Finland
Croatian expatriate sportspeople in Finland
South Australian Sports Institute alumni